Enge may refer to:

Enge (surname)
Enge (EP)
Enge (Zürich), a quarter of the city of Zürich, Switzerland
Enge, Estonia, village in Halinga Parish, Pärnu County, Estonia
Enge River, river in Estonia